Ridgefield is an unincorporated community and census-designated place in McHenry County, Illinois, United States. It was named a CDP before the 2020 census, at which time it had a population of 210. 

Ridgefield hosts a small number of antique shops in a small crossroads business district.  Ridgefield also has a large grain storage facility and a retail hardware store. Metra commuter trains pass through Ridgefield on their way to Chicago from Woodstock, Illinois without stopping, though there are currently shelved plans to build a station here.

History
A post office called Ridgefield was first established in 1858. The community was named from the ridges near the town site.

Demographics

2020 census

References

Census-designated places in Illinois
Census-designated places in McHenry County, Illinois
Chicago metropolitan area
Unincorporated communities in McHenry County, Illinois
Unincorporated communities in Illinois